Gunnar Hedlund  (1 October 1900 – 27 November 1989) was a Swedish politician. He was chairman of the Centre Party 1949–1971, Minister of the Interior 1951–1957 and member of the Riksdag (parliament) 1942–1976.

Hedlund was born in Helgum, Sollefteå Municipality, Ångermanland, and in 1926 Hedlund became a member of the municipal council of Helgum and in 1930 he became its chairman. He was very active in associations connected with silviculture. In 1938 he defended a dissertation at Uppsala University and became Juris Doctor.

In 1942 he was elected to the lower chamber of the Riksdag (parliament), representing the Centre Party, or Bondeförbundet (The Farmers' League) as it was known until 1957. In 1948 he took over the leadership of the party temporarily (when the former leader Axel Pehrsson-Bramstorp had suffered a stroke) and was formally elected to the post in 1949.

In 1951 the Centre Party entered into a coalition government with the Social Democrats, and Hedlund became Minister of the Interior, succeeding . In the end, the parties could not agree on a new pension system, and after a referendum in 1957 on the matter the Centre Party and the Social Democrats went their separate ways.

The Centre Party grew steadily from 1958 and in 1968 they had become the second largest party in Sweden. In 1971 Hedlund resigned as chairman and was succeeded by Thorbjörn Fälldin. Hedlund retained a seat in the Riksdag until 1976.

Awards and decorations
   Commander Grand Cross of the Order of the Polar Star (23 November 1955)
 Illis quorum (1984)

References

1900 births
1989 deaths
People from Sollefteå Municipality
Members of the Riksdag from the Centre Party (Sweden)
Leaders of political parties in Sweden
Uppsala University alumni
Members of the Riksdag 1970–1973
Members of the Riksdag 1974–1976
Commanders Grand Cross of the Order of the Polar Star
Recipients of the Illis quorum